Tony Swatton is a British-American blacksmith and gemcutter from Hammersmith, London, England. He is best known for creating props for films and television programmes. He was also the host of the popular webseries, Man at Arms.

History
Swatton is a self-educated blacksmith and a trained jeweller. When he was young, he used to cut gems and later expanded his skillset to include silversmithing. When he was 15, he met Jody Samson who had worked on the Conan the Barbarian film, and started to swap gems with Samson for knives. Unable to afford a knife, Swatton made one out of a file and showed it to Samson. Samson told him that it would break easily, as he hadn't used the right metal or type of treatment.

When he was 17, Swatton attended a renaissance fair where he observed another blacksmith making armour. Swatton then made copies of the blacksmith's equipment and used them to make his own helmet. When he was 26, he opened his first shop in North Hollywood called Sword and Stone where he sold products to Euro Disney and Michael Jackson. In 1991, he was employed to do his first film work on Hook. Between 1994 and 1998, Samson worked in Swatton's shop.

Webseries 
Swatton was involved in Man at Arms after he was approached by the director. The director was looking for a blacksmith who could create twelve particular weapons and approached Swatton. Swatton accepted as he had previously built prop versions of several of the weapons that had been listed to be created by the director. In the webseries, Swatton created real versions of fictional weapons and armour. Some of his creations included the Zenith Blade from League of Legends and Wolverine's claws from X-Men. The last episode featuring the creations of Tony aired in June 2014.

Beginning in April 2015, Swatton has starred in Blizzard Entertainment's intermittent Azeroth Armory webseries, in which he forges iconic weapons from the Warcraft video game series, with episodes typically released as part of the marketing push for new World of Warcraft expansions.

Personal 
Swatton has a fiancée. In 2013, he obtained American citizenship. Swatton was once a member of the Society for Creative Anachronism but left after other members wouldn't acknowledge hits on them from Swatton in mock battles, which led to him having to use force which caused Swatton to leave because he said he didn't want to be a bully.

Film credits
Swatton has been credited and even gone uncredited in many films and TV shows for his contribution to the props departments, making weapons or armour for them, some of the credited performances that he has been given are as follows:

References

External links
 Official Home Page – Sword and Stone
 League of Legends Community Program
 Official YouTube Channel – Aweme
 

Artists from London
Living people
People from Hammersmith
English expatriates in the United States
British blacksmiths
Year of birth missing (living people)
Prop designers
British jewellery designers
Society for Creative Anachronism